Jean-Louis de Marne (1752-24 March 1829) was a French painter.

Biography 

Born at Brussels in 1752, pupil of Gabriel Briard, Jean-Louis de Marne died at Batignolles near Paris on March 24, 1829.

He went to Paris at the age of 12 after the death of his father, who had been in Brussels as an officer in the service of the Emperor of Austria. Essayed first, historical subjects, then landscape of the classic and severe order. He had more success with paintings into which animals were introduced and with genre pieces.

He concentrated on landscape and genre painting, in which he was greatly influenced by such 17th century Dutch masters as Aelbert Cuyp, the van Ostade brothers, Paulus Potter, Adriaen van de Velde and Karel Dujardin, all artists enjoying a tremendous vogue and high prices in Paris at that time. His realist landscapes also meet Lazare Bruandet or Georges Michel paintings. On March 27, 1806, an official letter of Vivant Denon, general director of the Napoleon museum, informed him that the Emperor had chosen him to paint the Entrevue de Napoléon et de Pie VII dans la forêt de Fontainebleau, le 24 novembre 1804, 1808, national museum of Palace of Fontainebleau.J.-L. de Marne was made an associate of the Académie Royale in 1783 but did not become a full member. He seems to have cared little for official honours and later, in 1815, was unwilling to seek membership of the Institut de France. He was, however, awarded the Légion d'honneur by Charles X of France on April 23, 1828.His best period was between 1792 and 1808.

Notes 
 Watelin Jacques, le peintre J.-L. de Marne, La Bibliothèque des Arts, édition originale, Paris-Lausanne, 1962
 Wallace Collection London
 Encyclopedia Larousse
 Musée du Louvre

1744 births
1829 deaths
18th-century French painters
French male painters
19th-century French painters
Burials at Père Lachaise Cemetery
Chevaliers of the Légion d'honneur
19th-century French male artists
18th-century French male artists